Fernanda Arrias Machado (born 10 October 1980) is a Brazilian actress. She is best known for her role as Maria in the film Tropa de Elite.

Career
Her first television work was in 2004, when she played Sonya in Rede Globo's telenovela Começar de Novo, by Antônio Calmon and Elizabeth Jhin.

She played Dalila in 2005 Rede Globo's telenovela Alma Gêmea and Joana in 2007's telenovela Paraíso Tropical. where she won the 2007 best supporting actress of TV Globo. Fernanda Machado played the role of Laís in Rede Globo's 2009 telenovela Caras & Bocas, by Walcyr Carrasco.

She had previously worked with him in Alma Gêmea. Fernanda Machado starred in the same year as Maria in Tropa de Elite which won the Berlin Film Festival in 2008.

She was part of the cast of 2011 Rede Globo's telenovela Insensato Coração, playing the role of Luciana. Her character was killed in a plane crash on January 25, 2011's episode. In 2013 returns in the novels Amor à Vida, the plot she will live the villain Leila. After closing the filming of the film A Menina Índigo, in 2016, Machado decided to give a career break to dedicate to motherhood.

Personal life

On 2 February 2014, Fernanda married American entrepreneur Robert Riskin in São Luís Gongaza Chapel, Maringá. On 22 June 2015, she gave birth to Lucca, the couple's first child. He was born in Santa Barbara, California.

Filmography

Television

Film

Theater

References

External links

 
 

1980 births
Living people
People from Maringá
Brazilian television actresses
Brazilian film actresses
Brazilian stage actresses
Brazilian emigrants to the United States
People from Santa Barbara, California
Brazilian Roman Catholics
Naturalized citizens of the United States